The 1932 Carnegie Tech Tartans football team represented the Carnegie Institute of Technology—now known as Carnegie Mellon University—as an independent during the 1932 college football season. Led by Walter Steffen in his 18th and final season as head coach, the Tartans compiled a record of 4–3–2.

Schedule

References

Carnegie Tech
Carnegie Mellon Tartans football seasons
Carnegie Tech Tartans football